Moonshine is a suburb of Upper Hutt in the lower (southern) North Island of New Zealand. It comprises a rural area located northwest of urban Upper Hutt and south of Paekakariki.

References

Suburbs of Upper Hutt